Tower of Power (TOP) is an American rhythm and blues band from Oakland, California. Formed in August 1968, the group is centred around a horn section which originally featured tenor saxophonists Emilio "Mimi" Castillo and Steven "Skip" Mesquite, baritone saxophonist Stephen "Doc" Kupka, and trumpeters Greg Adams, David Padron, Mic Gillette and Ken Balzell. The rest of the original lineup included vocalist Rufus Miller, guitarist Willie James Fulton, bassist Francis Rocco Prestia and drummer David Garibaldi.

Castillo and Kupka remain the only constant members of TOP, the current incarnation of which also features Garibaldi (who mostly recently rejoined for a fourth tenure in the band in 1998), keyboardist Roger Smith (since 1998), trumpeter Adolfo Acosta (since 2000), tenor saxophonist Tom E. Politzer (since 2002), guitarist Jerry Cortez (since 2010), vocalist and trombonist Ray Greene (from 2013 to 2016, and since 2021), bassist Marc van Wageningen (since 2018), and trumpeter Mike Bogart (from 2000 to 2009, and since 2021).

History

1968–1981

TOP was formed in August 1968, after Emilio Castillo and Stephen Kupka met for the first time the month before. The original horn section also featured Steven "Skip" Mesquite on lead tenor saxophone, alongside Greg Adams, David Padron, Mic Gillette and Ken Balzell on trumpets and other brass. The rest of the band was filled out by vocalist Rufus Miller, guitarist Willie James Fulton, bassist Rocco Prestia and drummer David Garibaldi. During the recording of the group's debut album East Bay Grease in 1969, Rick Stevens replaced Miller in time to perform lead vocals on one track. Following the release of East Bay Grease, only Adams and Gillette remained on trumpets, while the group had been joined by Brent Byars on additional percussion. The new lineup released Bump City in 1972.

Shortly after the release of Bump City, Stevens, Fulton and Mesquite were replaced by Lenny Williams, Bruce Conte and Lenny Pickett, respectively, while Chester Thompson joined as the band's first keyboardist. In 1973 the band released a self-titled album, which was followed in 1974 by Back to Oakland. During the recording of the group's next album Urban Renewal, Garibaldi briefly left due to increasing drug use amongst other members. His place was taken by David Bartlett, before he returned in early 1975. Around the same time, Williams departed to pursue a solo career and Hubert Tubbs took over. Tubbs and Garibaldi left after In the Slot, replaced by Edward McGee and Ron E. Beck. Ain't Nothin' Stoppin' Us Now followed in 1976, before Prestia was fired in late 1977 due to ongoing problems with substance abuse. At the same time, McGee was forced to leave due to vocal problems. The pair were replaced by Victor Conte and Michael Jeffries.

With Jeffries and Conte, TOP released We Came to Play! in 1978, before both Contes and Beck left the band – Garibaldi returned again, while Danny Hoefer and Vito Sanfilippo took over on guitar and bass. After the release of Back on the Streets, Garibaldi left for a third time in 1980. He was replaced by Mark Sanders, while original guitarist Willie Fulton also returned in place of Hoefer. In 1981, the horn section expanded to three trumpeters again with the addition of Rick Waychesko. This 11-piece lineup released Direct that year.

1981–1994

Shortly after the release of Direct, long-term lead tenor saxophonist Lenny Pickett was replaced by Marc Russo. Waychesko left in 1982. During this period, TOP recorded an album that went unreleased until 1999, when it was issued as Dinosaur Tracks. After these sessions, in early 1983, keyboardist Chester Thompson left to join Santana. He was replaced by David K. Mathews. Around the same time, Mike Cichowicz took over from Waychesko. In 1984, the band's original bassist Francis Rocco Prestia returned, lead trumpet player Mic Gillette left to spend more time with his family, Ellis Hall replaced Michael Jeffries, and Mark Craney replaced Sanders. The following year, Richard Elliot replaced Russo. Craney remained until the summer of 1986, when he was forced to leave after contracting kidney disease.

In 1986, with Mick Mestek and Lee Thornburg replacing Craney and Cichowicz, the band recorded its first album in five years; the result, T.O.P., received a limited release, before it was edited and issued more widely as Power in 1987. After the album's recording, Fulton was replaced by Danny Jacob. By 1987, Jacob had made way for Frank Biner, while Mestek had been replaced by Steve Monreal. During 1988, Zeke Zirngiebel replaced Biner and Steve Grove replaced Elliot; Hall also left, with Castillo handling the majority of lead vocals, and Nick Milo taking over on keyboards. Later that year, Carmen Grillo took over from Zirngiebel on guitar.

During the tumultuous period following the release of 1987's Power, TOP reportedly came close to disbanding due to ongoing substance issues for leaders Castillo and Kupka, who became clean in 1988 and 1989, respectively. The additions of Milo and Grillo were followed by that of new vocalist Tom Bowes and drummer Russ McKinnon in 1989. Grove left in 1992, replaced by Paul Perez for the recording of 1993's T.O.P. For subsequent tour dates, David Mann took over the position.

1994–2009
Early 1994 saw another string of personnel changes in TOP: vocalist Brent Carter replaced Tom Bowes, drummer Herman Matthews replaced Russ McKinnon, and trumpeters Greg Adams and Lee Thornburg were replaced by Bill Churchville and Barry Danelian. Adams, a constant member since the band's formation, later stated about his departure simply that "I was at a point in my life where I needed to do something different. I was stagnating." The new lineup released Souled Out in 1995. The following year, John Scarpulla replaced David Mann. In early 1997, former Starship guitarist Jeff Tamelier replaced Carmen Grillo. After the release of Rhythm & Business that year, Danelien was replaced by Don Harris, who toured with the group from June to December 1997.

At the beginning of 1998, Matthews, Scarpulla and Harris were replaced by David Garibaldi (returning for his fourth tenure), Norbert Stachel and Jesse McGuire, respectively. The group recorded live album Soul Vaccination that October, after which Nick Milo left and Roger Smith took his place. In 2000, the band went through three more lineup changes: Mike Bogart replaced McGuire early in the year, Adolfo Acosta took over from Churchville in July, and Larry Braggs replaced Carter in November. When Stachel left to join Roger Waters' solo touring band in January 2002, Tom E. Politzer took his place in March.

During 2002 and 2003, Rocco Prestia was forced to step back from touring with TOP after having a liver transplant; he was replaced initially by Marc van Wageningen and later by Bobby Vega. In 2003, the band released its first studio album since 1997, Oakland Zone. By early 2006, Tamelier had left the band, replaced in the spring for tour dates by Trey Stone. By June that year, Stone had been replaced by former TOP guitarist Bruce Conte. Within a year he'd been replaced by Charles Spikes, who was replaced in late 2007 by Mark Harper. In 2008, TOP performed a special show to mark the 40th anniversary of its formation, which featured guest appearances by multiple former band members, and was released in 2011. The band issued Great American Soulbook in 2009, featuring Conte and Harper.

Since 2009
In August 2009, TOP founding member Mic Gillette rejoined the group after 25 years out of the lineup, when Mike Bogart departed "to pursue a career in music education". In January 2010, Jerry Cortez replaced Mark Harper on guitar. Gillette left again in February 2011, temporarily replaced by the returning Lee Thornburg before Sal Cracchiolo took over that August. In the summer of 2013, vocalist Larry Braggs announced that he would be leaving TOP at the end of the year. He was temporarily replaced starting in September by Ray Greene, who later became an official member when Braggs left in December. By April 2016, Marcus Scott had taken over the role of TOP's lead vocalist, after Greene left to join Santana in February.

During 2018, Rocco Prestia was forced to retire permanently from touring with TOP due to ongoing health issues, with former stand-in Marc van Wageningen taking his place again. Prestia continued to perform on studio recordings, but the band considered van Wageningen their 'official' bassist. Prestia later died on September 29, 2020. The band released Soul Side of Town in 2018 followed by Step Up in 2020, both of which featured recordings by the Greene- and Scott-fronted incarnations of the band. Also in 2018, the group performed a 50th anniversary show which was released as an album in 2021, featuring former members including tenor saxophonist Lenny Pickett, keyboardist Chester Thompson, guitarist Bruce Conte and vocalist Greene, who played trombone.

When they returned to touring in 2021 after a break due to the COVID-19 pandemic, the lineup of TOP featured Greene returning on lead vocals and Harry Kim in place of trumpeter Cracchiolo. Due in part to Kim's busy schedule, he was soon replaced by Mike Bogart, who played lead trumpet with the band from 2000 to 2009. In early 2022, Greene once again departed for Santana, and was replaced by former The Voice contestant Mike Jerel.

Members

Current

Former

Timelines

Horn section

Rhythm section

Lineups

References

External links
Tower of Power official website

Tower of Power